Haider Obeid (born 2 April 1979) is an Iraqi former football defender who last played for Amanat Baghdad. He played for Apollon Limassol in the Cypriot First Division and Zob Ahan F.C. in the Iran Pro League.Manager Zakho FC

Obeid is the younger brother of Iraqi midfielder Abbas Obeid. He was first brought into the international team by Najih Humoud during the International Friendly Tournament in the Emirates in November 1999, where Iraq won the competition topping a group featuring hosts U.A.E, Estonia and Turkmenistan.

Obeid was part of the Iraqi U-19s that won the 1998 Rajiv Gandhi Cup in India and qualified for the 1998 Asian Youth Championship in Thailand. After his outstanding performances while on loan at Al-Zawraa for the Asian Cup Winners Cup in season 1999/2000, he was recalled by Adnan Hamad for the West-Asian Championship in Amman, Jordan.

International career

International goals
Scores and results list Iraq's goal tally first.

Managerial statistics

References

External links
 

1979 births
Living people
Iraqi footballers
Iraq international footballers
Iraqi expatriate footballers
2000 AFC Asian Cup players
Apollon Limassol FC players
Al-Zawraa SC players
Expatriate footballers in Cyprus
Expatriate footballers in Qatar
Expatriate footballers in Iran
Expatriate footballers in Bahrain
Iraqi expatriate sportspeople in Bahrain
Al-Wakrah SC players
Al-Karkh SC players
riffa SC players
najaf FC players
Amanat Baghdad players
Zob Ahan Esfahan F.C. players
Cypriot First Division players
Qatar Stars League players
Association football defenders